WDLC (1490 AM) is a radio station broadcasting a country music format. Licensed to Port Jervis, New York, United States, the station serves the Sussex area.

History
WDLC began operation on July 4, 1953 owned by Oscar Wein with a popular music format focusing on artists like Frank Sinatra, Perry Como, Patti Page, Glenn Miller, Doris Day, Nat "King" Cole, Bing Crosby, among others. As artists like Elvis Presley, Ray Charles, The Platters, The Everly Brothers, and other rock and roll artists became popular, WDLC added softer songs from such artists. The station featured local news and community-oriented programming as well. By the late 1960s the station was mixing softer songs by artists such as the Beatles, Petula Clark, The Mamas & the Papas, Simon & Garfunkle, BJ Thomas, and others.

FM signs on
In 1970, Oscar Wein signed-on 96.7 WDLC-FM initially with a Country Music format. WDLC 1490 continued to play a Middle Of The Road (MOR) music format, by then also playing artists like Elton John, Neil Diamond, Carpenters, Tony Orlando, James Taylor, among others as well as current product. By then, along with Oscar, his wife (air name Kathy Burke) and son, Bob, were heard on the stations.

By the mid 1970s the Federal Communications Commission (FCC) relaxed simulcast restrictions between AM and FM radio stations. Because WDLC-FM was automated, they decided to begin simulcasting both stations. The MOR format was duplicated from 5 to 10 a.m. as well as from 3 to 7 p.m.; played Country music from 10 a.m. to 3 p.m. and 7 p.m. to 9 p.m., and instrumental easy listening music from 9 p.m. to 1 a.m. On Sundays, the station had many specialty shows.

In 1984 WDLC-FM began separate programming from the AM station, and eventually became WTSX (Tri-State Crossroads). The new station began with an Adult Contemporary format. WDLC continued the MOR format from 6 to 10 a.m. and from 3 to 7 p.m. and the country format from 10 a.m. to 3 p.m. and 7 p.m. to midnight. Both WTSX and WDLC-AM did well in terms of ratings and profitability through the 1980s. Later in that decade Oscar Wein retired and his son, Bob, took over operations. (Oscar Wein died on December 18, 2000 at the age of 82.). In 1995, WDLC dropped most of the specialty programs, its eclectic part-time MOR format, and part-time Country format in favor of a satellite delivered Oldies-leaning Adult Standards format called Stardust.

In the 1990s, both stations began to have financial troubles. As a result, in 1997, half the staff (including WDLC's newly hired morning man and program director) were laid off and WTSX became automated evenings and overnights. WDLC automated several years before using the satellite delivered Adult Standards format. In September 1998 Robert Wein began leasing WDLC and WTSX to Nassau Broadcasting in a local marketing agreement. The air talent and sales staff remained, becoming Nassau Broadcasting employees.

Nassau changed WTSX to a 1964-1969-based Oldies format, mixing in some early 1970s, late 1950s and early 1960s oldies as well. The ratings were low in the Southern Hudson Valley, but decent in the Sussex County radio market. WDLC kept the Standards/MOR format. In 2000, WDLC dropped Stardust in favor of Westwood One's "AM Only" format, which played Adult Standards mixed with a moderate amount of soft AC cuts and soft Oldies. In February 2001, Nassau sold the Local Marketing Agreement of WDLC and WTSX to Clear Channel Communications, along with full ownership of WSUS, WNNJ, and WHCY.

Move to Clear Channel
Under Clear Channel, WDLC remained an Adult Standards MOR station until 2003 when the station began simulcasting WTSX, which was airing Oldies from 1964 to 1979 with only a few pre '64 songs and a few '80s songs.

In September 2004 the Local Marketing Agreement with Clear Channel expired and Bob Wein opted not to renew it. As a result, most of the staff with the exception of their morning DJ Robert Oefinger (known on-air simply as "Bob-O"), remained under Clear Channel employ and moved aspects of the Oldies format on WDLC/WTSX to WNNJ 1360. This made Bob-O the only on-air personality at WDLC/WTSX.

By this time, Bob Wein again assumed operational control of WTSX and WDLC, however, the jingles and advertisers which the station had been using were Clear Channel's, and as a result, the station had no jingles and very few advertisers for a few weeks. The Oldies format deepened to include the hits of 1955 to 1990. The station announced they were "building a new radio station". In November 2004 new management (with intentions to buy) took over daily operations with Bob Wein retaining ownership. More on-air personalities were added with jingles and advertisers returning. It was thought that WTSX Fox 96.7 would remain an Oldies station.

Wein sells out
In early 2005 Fox 96.7 dropped most of the pre-1964 oldies. The new managers (now PJ Radio, L.L.C.) bought the station from Bob Wein. In March 2005, they began a Local Marketing Agreement with Hits 103.1 WGNY-FM from Newburgh, NY. The two stations combined airstaffs. Each station would have their own local shows, and local news was brought back. However, after the local morning show each day, both stations shadowcast, meaning they had the same announcers after 10 a.m., playing different songs at different times. More 1980s and 1990s music was added as well as some current and recent music. At this point, 1490 WDLC began simulcasting a 1955 to 1972 Oldies format with 1220 WGNY, Newburgh.

In January 2007, WDLC dropped the oldies format in favor of a sports talk format from ESPN Radio. In February 2009, the station returned to the WGNY simulcast. Currently, they are simulcasting WTSX with a classic hits format. In March 2012, Bud Williamson's Digital Radio Broadcasting (WYNY-1450AM Milford, PA) converted the LMA of WDLC (1490 Port Jervis) and WTSX (96.7 Lehman Township PA) into a purchase from Neversink Broadcasting Company, LLC, for $300,000.

On July 5, 2012 WDLC dropped the simulcast with WABT (the former WTSX) and changed their format to country, branded as "Country 107.7" (using the FM translator's frequency in its branding).

Notable DJs
Tony Trovato

References

External links

DLC